Thirumayilai MRTS station or just Mylapore MRTS station is a railway station on the Chennai MRTS line. It was started in 1997 which marked the completion of Phase I of the Chennai MRTS project. The station is located on the bank of Buckingham Canal, accessible from Ramakrishna Mutt road near Luz Corner. The Station building also comprises the Rail Vikas Nigam Limited (RVNL) office and Southern Railway's Computerized Ticket Reservation Centre. The Station building consists of 1050 sq.m of parking area in its basement.

The station is about 13.540 metres from mean sea level.

Developments
In September 2013, the Indian Railway Catering and Tourism Corporation (IRCTC) invited tenders for setting up a food plaza in the station, along with two other stations, namely, Thiruvanmiyur and Velachery.

See also
 Chennai MRTS
 Chennai suburban railway
 Chennai Metro
 Transport in Chennai

References

Chennai Mass Rapid Transit System stations
Railway stations in Chennai
Railway stations opened in 1997